Dennis Scott McKean is a lieutenant general in the United States Army who serves as deputy commanding general for Army Futures Command and the Director, Futures and Concepts Center. He previously served as the chief of staff for United States Central Command.

Early life and education
McKean was born in San Mateo County, California, and raised in San Jose, California. He graduated from Bellarmine College Preparatory in 1986. McKean was commissioned as an armor officer in 1990 from the United States Military Academy at West Point.

Military career

McKean's previous assignments include tank platoon leader and company executive officer in the 3rd Battalion, 73rd Armor Regiment and operations officer for the XVIII Airborne Corps Long Range Surveillance Company at Fort Bragg, North Carolina, as well as posts at Camp Red Cloud, Korea. He was also a tank company commander and headquarters company commander in the 4th Battalion, 64th Armor Regiment at Fort Stewart, Georgia.

McKean served as the operations officer and executive officer for the 1st Battalion, 67th Armored Regiment, 4th Infantry Division, during his deployment to Iraq. Later, he assumed duty as the deputy G3, 4th Infantry Division and deployed to Baghdad. He then commanded the 1st Battalion, 66th Armor Regiment and deployed back to Baghdad. He deployed again as the commander of the 4th Armored Brigade Combat Team, 1st Armored Division in 2011 as part of Operation New Dawn in Iraq.

Before his assignment at United States Central Command, McKean was assigned as the commanding officer of the 2nd Infantry Division.

Personal life
McKean is married with two children.

Awards and decorations

References

1968 births
Bellarmine College Preparatory alumni
Living people
People from San Jose, California
People from San Mateo County, California
Recipients of the Defense Superior Service Medal
Recipients of the Distinguished Service Medal (US Army)
Recipients of the Legion of Merit
United States Army generals
United States Army personnel of the Iraq War
United States Military Academy alumni